Makwa Sahgaiehcan is a Cree First Nation band government in Loon Lake, Saskatchewan, Canada. Their reserve is northeast of Lloydminster. The English translation of "Makwa Sahgaiehcan" is from Plains Cree language , meaning "loon lake". It is also the administrative headquarters of the Eagles Lake band government.

The First Nation has reserved for itself four reserves:

 Makwa Lake 129
 Makwa Lake 129A
 Makwa Lake 129B
 Makwa Lake 129C

References

External links 

 Official website

Cree governments
First Nations governments in Saskatchewan